is wagyū (Japanese beef) originating in the Shiga Prefecture, Japan. Ōmi means Ōmi Province, predecessor of Shiga. Ōmi beef is generally considered one of the three top brands, along with Kobe beef and Matsusaka beef.

Ōmi beef is said to be the oldest beef brand in Japan. In Azuchi–Momoyama period, Takayama Ukon who was associated with Ōmi Province treated the warlords to beef. In the Edo period, miso-marinated beef was sold and presented to the Tokugawa shogunate as a sustaining medicine by the Hikone Domain. In 1880s, Ōmi beef was sold as "Kobe beef" because it was shipped to Tokyo via Kobe Port, and since the completion of Tōkaidō Main Line, a railway between Shiga and Tokyo, "Ōmi beef" brand had become established gradually.

References

External links

 Official website

Beef
Japanese cuisine
Shiga Prefecture